Tuvia Katz (born 1936) is an Israeli artist.

Tuvia Katz was born in Poland to a traditional family. To escape the Nazis, his family fled Europe and settled in Argentina. In 1960, Katz immigrated to Israel and settled on Kibbutz Hokuk. At the age of forty, he became religious and studied for the rabbinate.

Katz is an abstract painter who creates faith-inspired art. He has won various prizes over the years. In 1979, he held a solo exhibition at the Israel Museum.

Katz is the founder and head of the "Art and Faith" program at Mikhlelet Yerushalayim in Bayit Vegan, Jerusalem.

He has three children and lives in Jerusalem. His daughter, Inbal, is married to Rabbi Eliezer Melamed, head of the Har Bracha yeshiva.

Awards 
1969 - America-Israel Cultural Foundation
1992 - Jerusalem Prize for painting

References

External links
Torah lessons, Tuvia Katz

1936 births
Israeli artists
Living people